Movila Banului is a commune in Buzău County, Muntenia, Romania. It is composed of three villages: Cioranca, Limpeziș and Movila Banului.

Notes

Communes in Buzău County
Localities in Muntenia